is a city located in Kanagawa Prefecture, Japan. , the city had an estimated population of 257,316 and a population density of 3800 persons per km².

Geography
Hiratsuka is located in the Shōnan area on the right bank (west side) of the Sagami River, almost in the center of Kanagawa Prefecture, and faces Sagami Bay to the south. The area from the Sagami River to the Kaname River is a plain to the northern end of the city area, and the urban area extends to the south. The west side of the Kaname River is a hilly area that is part of the Oiso Hills, and there is a lot of greenery. It is approximately midway between Tokyo and Mount Fuji.

Surrounding municipalities
Kanagawa Prefecture 
Chigasaki
Hadano
Atsugi
Isehara
Samukawa
Nakai
Oiso
Ninomiya

Climate
Hiratsuka has a Humid subtropical climate (Köppen Cfa) characterized by warm summers and cool winters with light to no snowfall.  The average annual temperature in Hiratsuka is 14.6 °C. The average annual rainfall is 2144 mm with September as the wettest month. The temperatures are highest on average in August, at around 25.2 °C, and lowest in January, at around 4.4 °C.

Demographics
Per Japanese census data, the population of Hiratsuka has more than doubled over the past 60 years.

History
The area around Hiratsuka has been settled since prehistoric times, and mention of the area as part of ancient Ōsumi District, Sagami Province is found in Nara period records. From the Heian period through Kamakura period, the area was divided into shōen controlled by various samurai clans and in the Sengoku period was the site of several battles between the later Hōjō clan of Odawara and the Miura clan. After the defeat of the Odawara at the Battle of Odawara by Hideyoshi Toyotomi, the area came under the control of Ieyasu Tokugawa, who built a summer palace (the Nakahara Goten) in 1596 at the site now occupied by the Hiratsuka City Nakahara Elementary/Primary School. Hiratsuka was retained as tenryō territory after the establishment of the Tokugawa shogunate, and flourished as Hiratsuka-juku, a post town on the Tōkaidō connecting Edo with Kyoto. As the 7th station, it is often depicted in the series of ukiyo-e about the 53 Stations of the Tōkaidō made among others by artists such Hokusai and Hiroshige.

After the Meiji Restoration, Hiratsuka town was founded on April 1, 1889 with the creation of the municipalities system, as part of the new Naka District within Kanagawa Prefecture. It merged with neighboring Suma Town on April 1, 1929, and was proclaimed Hiratsuka City on April 1, 1932.

Hiratsuka was largely destroyed on  July 16, 1945, during the Bombing of Hiratsuka in World War II. Due to its strategic location and wide beaches, it was also one of the targets for the planned invasion of Japan during the final stages of World War II.

The city quickly rebuilt after the war, annexing several neighboring villages in the mid-1950s to attain its current area. The population exceeded 200,000 by 2001 and Hiratsuka became a special city with increased autonomy from the central government. The current mayor is the independent Katsuhiro Ochai  (落合克宏) who was elected April 24, 2011, and assumed office on April 30. Previously he had served two terms on the Hiratsuka city council and as council chairperson for the majority of the second term.  Ochai succeeded Ritsuko Okura, the city's first female mayor, who served from 2003 to 2011.

Government
Hiratsuka has a mayor-council form of government with a directly elected mayor and a unicameral city council of 26 members. Hiratsuka contributes three members to the Kanagawa Prefectural Assembly. In terms of national politics, the city is part of Kanagawa 15th district of the lower house of the Diet of Japan.

Economy
Hiratsuka has a mixed economy, with tax revenue coming from bets made at the Shonan Bank Cycling Velodrome and, several industries located in industrial parks in the outskirts of town. Major plants are operated by Nissan Shatai, Yokohama Rubber Company, Canon, Furukawa Electric, Pilot (pen company)  - the famous Namiki pens are produced at Hiratsuka, Kansai Paint, and Mitsubishi Plastics. Nissan Shatai is the largest employer in the city, but announced plans to move a factory to Kanda. Western firms such as Moog and MacDermid Performance Solutions also have a strong presence in this city. Hiratsuka is also a bedroom community for Yokohama and Tokyo, with residents attracted by the "Shōnan lifestyle".

Education
Hiratsuka has 28 public elementary schools and 15 public middle schools operated by the city government. The city has five public high schools operated by the Kanagawa Prefectural Board of Education and one private high school. The prefecture also operates four special education schools for the handicapped. A private junior college, the Tokai University Junior College of Nursing and Technology is located within Hiratsuka, which also has branch campuses of Kanagawa University, Shoin University and Tokai University.

Transportation

Railway
 JR East -  Tōkaidō Main Line, Shōnan Shinjuku Line

Highway
 
, to Tokyo or Kyoto
, to Sagamihara
, to Yokosuka via Kamakura
, to Atsugi or Odawara (toll)
Shinshōnan Bypass

Tourist attractions

Tanabata festival
Shonan Bellmare football club, three-time Japanese champions based at Hiratsuka Athletics Stadium
Kana Garden
Hiratsuka Hachiman-gu, Shinto shrine
Hiratsuka Museum of Art

Sister cities
 Takayama, Gifu, Japan, since October 22, 1982
 Hanamaki, Iwate, Japan, since April 27, 1984
 Izu, Shizuoka, Japan, since February 6, 2013
 Lawrence, Kansas, United States, since September 21, 1990
 Alytus, Lithuania, since 2017

Notable people from Hiratsuka
Izumi Sakai - singer, songwriter, vocal of Zard
Yukari Fukui - voice actress
Yamanashi Hanzō - general, politician
Lalla Hirayama, Japanese—born South African television host, actress, dancer and model
Michael Hora - former child actor
Phongchi - Japanese idol of Vietnamese descent
Yuki Kubota, actress, model
Michiko Kawai, actress
Mitsunori Takaboshi, racing driver

References

External links 

Official Website 

 
Cities in Kanagawa Prefecture
Populated coastal places in Japan